Ko Hoku o Ka Pakipika (English for "The Star of the Pacific") was a weekly Hawaiian-language newspaper that was active between 1861–1863. It was the first newspaper in history publish in Hawaiian and by Native Hawaiians. King Kalākaua sponsored the newspaper along with other publications.

The paper tended to challenge the idea that the Native Hawaiians were uncivilized. It wrote about the threats to the Hawaiian culture and the islands native population.

References

External links 

 Digitised archive

Defunct newspapers published in Hawaii
Hawaiian language
History of Hawaii
1861 establishments in Hawaii